Radha Balakrishnan is an Indian theoretical physicist. She is a retired professor at the Institute of Mathematical Sciences, Chennai, India. After her early work in condensed matter physics on quantum crystals, she switched fields to nonlinear dynamics and has published research papers on a variety of topics.

Education
Balakrishnan pursued her Physics Honours from Delhi University and finished her M.Sc in 1965. She has a Ph.D from Brandeis University where her thesis was one of the earliest studies of quantum crystals on the effects of 4He impurities in solid 3He.

Career
During the 1980s, when Balakrishnan returned to India, she worked at the Department of Theoretical Physics, University of Madras as a Research Associate. She joined Institute of Mathematical Sciences, Chennai in 1987. She retired in the year 2004 and since that time, Balakrishnan is continuing her research as a CSIR Emeritus Scientist. Her current research is on Nonlinear Dynamics, Solitons and Applications in Physics, Connections to Classical Differential Geometry.

Personal life 

Radha Balakrishnan is married to V. Balakrishnan who is an Indian theoretical physicist. Their two children, Hari Balakrishnan and Hamsa Balakrishnan, are both faculty members at MIT.

Awards & honours
From the 1990s, she had been studying the deep connections between nonlinearity and the differential geometry of curves and surfaces. Balakrishnan received the Tamil Nadu Scientists Award in the Physical Sciences (1999) for her work. She also received INSA’s Professor Darshan Ranganathan Memorial Lecture Award (2005) for original and pioneering contributions in nonlinear dynamics.

References

External links

Indian women physicists
20th-century Indian physicists
Scientists from Chennai
Living people
Delhi University alumni
Brandeis University alumni
Articles created or expanded during Women's History Month (India) - 2014
20th-century Indian women scientists
21st-century Indian physicists
21st-century Indian women scientists
Women scientists from Tamil Nadu
Year of birth missing (living people)